Canucks Sports & Entertainment, previously known as Orca Bay Sports & Entertainment, is a Canadian sports and entertainment company in Vancouver, British Columbia that owns and operates the Vancouver Canucks of the National Hockey League, the Vancouver Warriors of the National Lacrosse League, and their home arena, Rogers Arena.

History
As Vancouver executive Arthur Griffiths overspent building General Motors Place, where the NHL's Vancouver Canucks and the upcoming NBA expansion Vancouver Grizzlies would play, in March 1995 he associated with Seattle billionaire John McCaw Jr. - then a co-owner of the Seattle Mariners - to form the Northwest Entertainment Group, which would control both teams and the arena. On August 22 the company was rebaptized Orca Bay Sports and Entertainment, in homage to the killer whales that roam on the British Columbia coast. In 1996, McCaw assumed full ownership of the company and its assets.

Citing mounting losses, on August 21, 1999, Orca Bay announced that the Grizzlies, Canucks and GM Place were up for sale. The Grizzlies were purchased for $160 million in 2000 by Chicago businessman Michael Heisley, who after another losing season relocated the team to Tennessee in 2001, where it became the Memphis Grizzlies. While for three years Orca Bay considered selling the Canucks to North American investors, by 2003 the team's improved performances had the company give up on this. In November 2004, Vancouver-based investment company the Aquilini Investment Group purchased 50% of the company from McCaw and two years later bought the remaining 50%. In 2008, AIG rechristened the company Canucks Sports & Entertainment feeling the team's brand was strong enough for its parent company.

It was reported on May 11, 2009 by local radio station the TEAM 1040 that Francesco Aquilini and Canucks Sports & Entertainment had expressed interest in purchasing the Indiana Pacers of the National Basketball Association and moving the team to Vancouver. A possible deal would depend on if Pacers owners Herbert and Melvin Simon can secure a new lease agreement with the Indianapolis Capital Improvement Board who own their home arena, the Conseco Fieldhouse (now Bankers Life Fieldhouse). In 2011, rumours surfaced of Aquilini wanting to purchase the then-New Orleans Hornets; however, the Hornets, since renamed the Pelicans, were sold to Tom Benson, owner of the National Football League's New Orleans Saints, in April 2012.

In June 2018, Canucks Sports and Entertainment purchased the Vancouver Stealth of the National Lacrosse League. The team was rebranded as the Vancouver Warriors and relocated from the Vancouver suburb of Langley, British Columbia to Rogers Arena in Vancouver. Canucks Sports and Entertainment became the fifth NHL owner to purchase an NLL franchise.

Assets

Present
 Vancouver Canucks, a National Hockey League team (valued at US$800 million, 5th in the NHL)
 Rogers Arena, an indoor sports arena
 Abbotsford Canucks, an American Hockey League team
 Vancouver Warriors, a National Lacrosse League team
Vancouver Titans, an Overwatch League esports team
Seattle Surge, a Call of Duty League esports team

Past
 Vancouver Grizzlies, a National Basketball Association team

References

Abbotsford Canucks
Companies based in Vancouver
Sports management companies
Vancouver Canucks
Vancouver Grizzlies
Vancouver Warriors
1995 establishments in British Columbia
Vancouver Titans